Ide was an ancient Greek city located in ancient Thrace, located in the region of the Thracian Chersonesus. It is cited in the Periplus of Pseudo-Scylax, in the second position of its recitation of the towns of the Thracian Chersonesus, along with Cardia, Ide, Paeon, Alopeconnesus, Araplus, Elaeus and Sestos.

Its site is located 4 miles (6.5 km) west of Bolayir, Çanakkale Province, Turkey.

See also
Greek colonies in Thrace

References

Populated places in ancient Thrace
Former populated places in Turkey
Greek colonies in the Thracian Chersonese
History of Çanakkale Province